Upper Heyford may refer to:

Upper Heyford, Northamptonshire
Upper Heyford, Oxfordshire
RAF Upper Heyford, Oxfordshire